Pobochnevo is a rural locality (a village) in Malyginskoye Rural Settlement, Kovrovsky District, Vladimir Oblast, Russia. The population was 25 as of 2010.

Geography 
Pobochnevo is located on the Naromsha River, 15 km northwest of Kovrov (the district's administrative centre) by road. Privolye is the nearest rural locality.

References 

Rural localities in Kovrovsky District